Sambucus javanica, the Chinese elder, is a species of elderberry in the family Adoxaceae native to subtropical and tropical Asia. It is found naturally in Bhutan, Burma, Cambodia, China (except in the north), India, Indonesia, Japan, Laos, Malaysia (in Sabah), the Philippines, southern Thailand, and Vietnam.

Parts of the plant are used locally, variously as analgesics, blood purifiers, bowel and bladder stimulants, or even for poison. It is also believed to be an aid against numbness, rheumatism, spasms, swelling, and trauma, as well as for general bone and circulatory health.

References

javanica
Flora of China
Flora of Japan
Flora of Taiwan
Flora of tropical Asia
Plants described in 1826
Paleotropical flora
Medicinal plants